K. Anders Ericsson (October, 23, 1947 – June 17, 2020) was a Swedish psychologist and Conradi Eminent Scholar and Professor of Psychology at Florida State University who was internationally recognized as a researcher in the psychological nature of expertise and human performance.

Ericsson studied expert performance in domains such as medicine, music, chess, and sports, focusing exclusively on extended deliberate practice  (e.g., high concentration practice beyond one's comfort zone) as a means of how expert performers acquire their superior performance. Critically, Ericsson's program of research served as a direct complement to other research that addresses cognitive ability, personality, interests, and other factors that help researchers understand and predict deliberate practice and expert performance.

Career
Ericsson received a PhD in 1976 from Stockholm University.

With Bill Chase, he developed the Theory of Skilled Memory based on detailed analyses of acquired exceptional memory performance (Chase, W. G., & Ericsson, K. A. (1982). Ericsson's research with Herbert A. Simon on verbal reports of thinking is summarized in a book Protocol Analysis: Verbal Reports as Data, which was revised in 1993. In G. H. Bower (Ed.), The psychology of learning and motivation, (Vol. 16). New York: Academic Press). One of his most striking experimental results was training a student to have a digit span of more than 100 digits. With Walter Kintsch, he extended this theory into long-term memory to account for the superior working memory of expert performers and memory experts. 

In the domain of deliberate practice, Ericsson published an edited book with Jacqui Smith Toward a General Theory of Expertise in 1991 and edited a book The Road to Excellence: The Acquisition of Expert Performance in the Arts and Sciences, Sports and Games that appeared in 1996, as well as a collection edited with Janet Starkes Expert Performance in Sports: Recent Advances in Research on Sport Expertise in 2003.  In 2016 he and Robert Pool published the book Peak: Secrets from the New Science of Expertise.

Ericsson was the co-editor of The Cambridge Handbook of Expertise and Expert Performance, a volume released in 2006. He was also Fellow of the American Psychological Association.

Publications

Notes and references

External links
 Florida State University faculty profile

1947 births
Florida State University faculty
Swedish psychologists
Memory researchers
Fellows of the American Psychological Association
2020 deaths

See also
Outliers: The Story of Success